Bradina plagalis is a moth in the family Crambidae. It was described by Frederic Moore in 1867. It is found in Darjeeling, India.

References

Moths described in 1867
Bradina